Marion Wharton (16 July 1908 – February 1993) was a British gymnast. She competed in the women's artistic team all-around event at the 1936 Summer Olympics.

References

1908 births
1993 deaths
British female artistic gymnasts
Olympic gymnasts of Great Britain
Gymnasts at the 1936 Summer Olympics
Sportspeople from Keighley